TCDD DE18100 are a type of diesel-electric road switcher built for operations on Turkish State Railways by Matériel de Traction Electrique. Based on the same platform and order as the DE24000, it was a light-axle version of the locomotive, very similar to the DE18000, though with a different wheel arrangement. The units have mostly been used around Izmir. They previously pulled Denizli-İzmir regional trains. Now they are used in shunting operations along with TCDD DE24000. DE 18 105 and DE 18 110 are the only remaining running units, DE 18 103 is revised from DE 18 003, all others are scrapped.

References

External links

Turkish State Railways diesel locomotives
A1A-A1A locomotives
Standard gauge locomotives of Turkey
Railway locomotives introduced in 1978